The ATM Class 4900 is a series of articulated trams used by the ATM on the Milan urban tramway network.

They were built from 1976 to 1978 in two series, by Fiat Ferroviaria and Stanga, respectively, and were intended to be used on the future light rail lines, like the proposed circular line that should substitute the existing circular trolleybus line.

However such lines were never built, and the 4900 were used on the existing network.

Bibliography 
 Carlo Marzorati: Le nuove elettromotrici ATM 4900. In: ″Italmodel Ferrovie″ Nr. 202 (March 1977), p. 156–160.
 Giovanni Klaus Koenig: Il tram a pianale ribassato: storia e sviluppi. In: ″Ingegneria Ferroviaria″, May 1985, p. 223–241.
 Giovanni Cornolò, Giuseppe Severi: Tram e tramvie a Milano 1840-1987., Azienda Trasporti Municipali, Milan 1987.

External links 

Tram vehicles of Italy
Light rail vehicles
Transport in Milan
Fiat Ferroviaria
600 V DC multiple units